Bernried station is a railway station in the municipality of Bernried am Starnberger See, located in the Weilheim-Schongau district in Bavaria, Germany.

Notable places nearby
Bernrieder Park
Starnberger See

References

External links
 
 Bernried layout 
 

Railway stations in Bavaria
Buildings and structures in Weilheim-Schongau